Saxifraga callosa, the limestone saxifrage, is a species of flowering plant in the family Saxifragaceae, that is native to maritime alpine habitats in Western Europe (Italy, France and Spain). The starry, pure white flowers are borne in long panicles in spring.

The Latin specific epithet callosa means “thick-skinned, with calluses”.

Lower taxa
Saxifraga callosa is a variable species depending on location, Two subspecies and at least two varieties are recognised:- 
Saxifraga callosa subsp. callosa
var. australis
var. callosa
Saxifraga callosa subsp. catalaunica

Cultivation
Saxifraga callosa is cultivated as an ornamental garden plant. As it requires well-drained alkaline soil in full sun, it is often grown in an alpine house, where specialist conditions can be provided. It has gained the Royal Horticultural Society’s Award of Garden Merit.

References

callosa
Flora of France
Flora of Spain
Alpine flora